Železnice may refer to:

Slovenske železnice -Slovenian state railway
Železnice Slovenskej republiky -Slovak state railway
Železnice - a town in the northern Czech Republic.